T. Rex were an English rock band, formed in 1967 by singer/songwriter and guitarist Marc Bolan. The group came to an end after Bolan's death in a car crash in September 1977.

The T. Rex discography consists of four "Tyrannosaurus Rex" and ten "T. Rex" studio albums (one of which was a revision of another album, with a different name and tracklisting, for release in different territories; and another which was released posthumously),  11 live albums, 28 compilation albums, 21 box sets, one remix album, 18 extended plays, seven "Tyrannosaurus Rex" singles (of which one posthumously released) and 39 "T. Rex" singles (of which 13 were posthumously released, including several charting reissues).

Albums

Studio albums

As Tyrannosaurus Rex

As T. Rex

Live albums

Remix albums

Compilation albums

Box sets

Video albums

EPs

Singles

As Tyrannosaurus Rex

As T. Rex

Notes

References

External links

Discographies of British artists
Rock music group discographies